Ashburton Learning Village is a learning complex in Woodside, Greater London. It stands in the London Borough of Croydon, and is located near Ashburton Park. The learning village includes Ashburton Library, Oasis Academy Shirley Park, Croydon Music Service and a CALAT training centre. The complex was built after the old Ashburton Library was closed down. The nearest Tramlink stop is Woodside. The centre is earmarked as Croydon's Flagship Learning Village.

The £20 million secondary school, library and community facilities is the borough's first education Private Finance Initiative (PFI) development. Photovoltaic cells integrated into clerestory glazing will cast dappled shadows along a three-storey central concourse running through the heart of the building. An overhanging roof canopy will provide shelter to the main public entrance.

Former energy minister Malcolm Wicks praised the new development in Croydon, for its innovative design and energy-efficient features.

The then MP for Croydon North said 

The south-facing building, designed by architects Penoyre & Prasad and built by Norwest Holst, includes many environmentally friendly features which includes:

Special features
 The largest solar panels to be installed in a building in the UK
 A rain water tank to feed toilets and service sinks
 Movement-sensitive automatic lights
 Sun tubes for rooms without windows in the form of polished chrome cylinders that are fitted in the ceiling and protrude from the roof and, with the help of micro prism glass, magnify the light coming into the room and thus reduce the need for electric lights
 Floor-to-ceiling windows and sky lights in the library, which again reduce the need for electric lights
 A brise soleil – a permanent blind that stops glare from the sun but allows maximum daylight into rooms – installed on the outside of the library windows
 Air-pressure tests to ensure the buildings heat insulation reaches the required standard
 School computer equipment locked into desks and only activated by a main key, reducing the possibility of theft and damage, while allowing full use to users.

As well as Croydon Music Service and CETS having access to these amenities, the entire community will benefit as they are available for use after school hours, at weekends and during school holidays. In particular, members of the public can use the gym areas and changing rooms daily.

School safety was also high on the design brief and all areas have been made secure with the use of card keys. Everyone entering the building must do so through the main reception. Locked areas are automatically deactivated if the fire alarm should go off.

In March, the former Secretary of State for Education Ruth Kelly MP visited the learning village, and marked the end of the construction period with a foundation stone taken from the original school, which opened in 1950.

She said 

Work on Ashburton Learning Village, Shirley Road, Croydon, started in June 2004 but plans to redevelop the school had been in the pipeline since 2001, when Croydon Council secured government backing from the then Department for Education and Employment through the Private Finance Initiative (PFI).

Additional PFI credits were granted by the Department for Culture, Media and Sport and the Department of Trade and Industry, enabling Ashburton Library to move from its current home in Ashburton Park and allowing the more ambitious plans to create a learning village for the whole community to be developed.

As part of the project, 100 new homes will be built on the surplus land. Once the school has moved into its new accommodation, the old buildings will be demolished. A special needs learning hub and community space will be opened at the old Ashburton library site in the summer of 2017.

Under the PFI agreement, Jarvis plc is responsible for the maintenance of the building for the next 30 years.

Ashburton Community School was replaced by Oasis Academy: Shirley Park in 2009.

Oasis Academy Shirley Park 

Oasis Academy Shirley Park (formerly Ashburton Community School) is an academic school located in the centre of the learning village.

Notable alumni 
Alex Wynter, footballer with Crystal Palace, attended 2005–2010.
Louis John, footballer with Crystal Palace, attended 2005–2010.
Harry Osborne, footballer with Crystal Palace, attended 2005–2010.
Jerome Williams, footballer with Crystal Palace, attended 2004–2010.
Ibra Sekajja, footballer with Barnet (on loan from Crystal Palace), attended 2004–2009.
Sean Scannell, footballer with Huddersfield Town, attended 2002–2007.
Damian Scannell, footballer with Eastleigh, attended 1996–2001.
Neal Ardley, manager of Notts County and former footballer with Wimbledon F.C.
Dean Leacock, footballer with Notts County.

Ashburton Library
Ashburton Library is a Public Library located in the learning village. It is owned by Croydon Council and is part of the Croydon Libraries arm of the council . The library, unlike many other Croydon Libraries, is based on only one floor. Croydon has said that it would like to redo all of its libraries so they could all be accessible by users who are disabled. The library moved in when it finished building in March, 2006.

Like all Croydon libraries it includes free access to PCs which includes the internet. Books, CDs, DVDs, videos for reference and loan.

Here's a list of other things which the library includes:

Children's library
Enquiry service
Local history material
Black and white photocopier
Books in community languages
Newspapers and periodicals
Community information
Reading groups

The library is closed on Wednesdays and Sundays. Plus the following baby and toddler events take place during the school term. Bookstart Rhymetime, Wiggle and Jiggle and Storytime.

See also 
Ashburton Park
Woodside tram stop

External links

Ashburton Learning Village 
24dash – 5 May 2006
NLA – New London Architecture
24dash – 16 March 2006

Ashburton Library 
Croydon Council – Ashburton Library

Oasis Academy 
Oasis Academy :Shirley Park website

References

Leisure in the London Borough of Croydon
Buildings and structures in the London Borough of Croydon
Culture in the London Borough of Croydon
Education in the London Borough of Croydon